Una Taufa is a former professional rugby league footballer who played in the 1990s. Una Taufa was a Tonga international and played at the 1995 Rugby League World Cup. During this competition, he was a member of the Canberra Raiders side.

References

External links
World Cup 1995 details

Living people
Tonga national rugby league team players
Tongan rugby league players
Rugby league wingers
Year of birth missing (living people)